Nagchu may refer to:

Nagqu, prefecture-level city in Tibet
Seni District, district in Tibet, formerly Nagqu County
Nagqu Town, town in Nagchu County